Research in Gerontological Nursing is a monthly peer-reviewed nursing journal covering gerontological nursing. It was established in 2008 and is published by Healio.

History
The journal was established as a quarterly journal in 2008 with Kathleen Buckwalter as founding editor-in-chief. She served until 2012, when she was succeeded by Christine R. Kovach.

In 2014, the journal increased its publication frequency from four issues per year to six.

Abstracting and indexing
The journal is abstracted and indexed in:

According to the Journal Citation Reports, the journal has a 2017 impact factor of 0.855.

See also

List of nursing journals

References

External links

Monthly journals
English-language journals
Gerontological nursing journals
Bimonthly journals